Dreams of Ordinary Men is the eighth studio album recorded by Australian-New Zealand rock band Dragon. The album was released in August 1986 and peaked at number 18 on the Australian Kent Music Report and was certified platinum in November 1986.

Track listing
Side A
"Dreams of Ordinary Men " (Alan Mansfield, Doane Perry, Johanna Pigott, Todd Hunter, Todd Rundgren) - 4:02                                      
"Speak No Evil" (Alan Mansfield, Johanna Pigott, Todd Hunter) - 3:34                                                        
"Nothing to Lose" (Johanna Pigott, Todd Hunter) - 4:20                                                    
"Western Girls" (Alan Mansfield, Marc Hunter, Sharon O'Neill, Todd Rundgren) - 4:10                                                          
"Intensive Care" (Alan Mansfield, Marc Hunter) - 4:25                                                     
"Temptation" (Alan Mansfield, Johanna Pigott, Todd Hunter) - 4:10  
Side B                                                        
"Midnight Sun" (Todd Rundgren) - 3:30                                                        
"Love Don’t Stop" (Johanna Pigott, Todd Hunter) - 3:42                                                   
"Forever and Ever" (Alan Mansfield, Johanna Pigott, Todd Hunter) - 3:24                                              
"Smoke" (Johanna Pigott, Marc Hunter, Todd Hunter) - 4:42                                                                 
"Start It Up"  (Alan Mansfield, Doane Perry, Marc Hunter, Todd Hunter) - 4:20
"When I’m Gone" (Marc Hunter, Martin Briley) - 3:30

Charts

Certifications

Personnel 
 Todd Hunter - Bass, Vocals
 Marc Hunter - Vocals
 Alan Mansfield - Keyboards
 Doane Perry - Drums
with:
 Tommy Emmanuel - Guitar
 Todd Rundgren - Guitar [Additional], Backing Vocals
 Gary Window, Lenny Pickett - Saxophone
Production
 Management – Stephen White
 Other [Fairlight Cmi Bass] – Todd Hunter
 Photography By – Janette Beckman
 Producer – Todd Rundgren
 Engineer – Chris Andersen, Todd Rundgren
 Remix – Jason Corsaro (tracks: 3 to 6, 8 to 10, 12), Jim Boyer (tracks: 3 to 6, 8 to 10, 12)
 Art Direction, Design – The Cream Group

References

1986 albums
Dragon (band) albums
Albums produced by Todd Rundgren
Polydor Records albums